Dent Island is the name of several places:

 Dent Island, New Zealand, an island belonging to the Campbell Island group
 Dent Island (Queensland), one of the Whitsunday Islands in Australia